This is a list of members of the Australian House of Representatives from 1987 to 1990, as elected at the 1987 federal election. They were together known as the 35th Parliament.

 The Labor member for Adelaide, Chris Hurford, resigned on 31 December 1987; Liberal candidate Mike Pratt won the resulting by-election on 6 February 1988.
 The Labor member for Port Adelaide, Mick Young, resigned on 12 February 1988; Labor candidate Rod Sawford won the resulting by-election on 26 April 1988.
 The National member for the Toowoomba-based Groom, Tom McVeigh, resigned on 29 February 1988; Liberal candidate Bill Taylor won the resulting by-election on 9 April 1988.
 The Labor member for Oxley (QLD), Bill Hayden, resigned on 17 August 1988; Labor candidate Les Scott won the resulting by-election on 8 October 1988.
 The National member for Gwydir (NSW), Ralph Hunt, resigned on 24 February 1989; National candidate John Anderson won the resulting by-election on 15 April 1989.

References

Members of Australian parliaments by term
20th-century Australian politicians